Eliu Rivera (December 8, 1943 – October 1, 2017) was a Democratic Party politician who represented District 4 on the Hudson County, New Jersey Board of Chosen Freeholders, one of nine members who serve in a legislative role administering all county business. District 4 includes portions of the City of Jersey City, New Jersey. He served in office from 2006 to July 1, 2013, when he resigned from office and was replaced by E. Junior Maldonado.

Rivera was born in Aibonito, Puerto Rico and migrated with his family to the mainland United States at an early age. He attended local schools, graduated from William L. Dickinson High School in Jersey City. Then worked in the United States Postal Service and continued his education at Rutgers University and Saint Peter's University.

A community activist, Rivera was employed by the Puertorriqueños Asociados for Community Organization (P.A.C.O.) agency since 1970 and serving as its Executive Director, Rivera worked extensively in the housing, economic development, health, education and community development areas.

Rivera is a former Deputy Mayor of Jersey City. In 2012, the corner of Manila Avenue and Second Street was renamed in his honor.

Rivera died on October 1, 2017, at Menonita Hospital in his hometown Aibonito, Puerto Rico, at age 73, from the lingering effects of a chemical he had accidentally inhaled six years earlier that required him to breathe from an oxygen tank.

References

1943 births
2017 deaths
People from Aibonito, Puerto Rico
Hispanic and Latino American politicians
County commissioners in New Jersey
New Jersey city council members
New Jersey Democrats
Politicians from Jersey City, New Jersey
William L. Dickinson High School alumni
Rutgers University alumni
Saint Peter's University alumni
21st-century American politicians
Puerto Rican people in New Jersey politics